The Luxembourg national football team represents the nation of Luxembourg in international association football. It is controlled by the Luxembourg Football Federation, the governing body of football in Luxembourg, and competes as a member of UEFA.

Luxembourg played their first ever international match on 29 October 1911, in a friendly match against France; it resulted in a 1-4 defeat.

List of Luxembourg international footballers
The following is a list of all players who have played for Luxembourg in an official, senior international match and earning more than 20 caps.

Bold indicate players who are still playing. A yellow background indicates the most recent match.

Source

See also
:Category:Luxembourg international footballers
Luxembourg national football team#Current squad

References

 
Association football player non-biographical articles